South Pass City is an unincorporated community in Fremont County, Wyoming, United States. A former station on the Oregon Trail, it became a ghost town after later gold mines were closed. The entire community is listed on the National Register of Historic Places. The closest town is Atlantic City. Some people have returned.

History 
South Pass City developed rapidly as a stage and telegraph station on the Oregon Trail during the 1850s. Burnt Ranch was located where the Emigrant Trails crossed the Sweetwater River for the last time and ascended toward the South Pass.

In August 1861, 25-year-old Samuel Clemens (later Mark Twain) passed through South Pass City via stagecoach with his brother Orion, newly appointed as Secretary of Nevada Territory.  Mark Twain later wrote about the experience in Roughing It, first published in 1872: ". . . we hove in sight of South Pass City. The hotelkeeper, the postmaster, the blacksmith, the mayor, the constable, the city marshal and the principal citizen and property holder, all came out and greeted us cheerily, and we gave him good day. He gave us a little Indian news, and a little Rocky Mountain news, and we gave him some Plains information in return. He then retired to his lonely grandeur and we climbed on up among the bristling peaks and the ragged clouds. South Pass City consisted of four log cabins, one of which was unfinished, and the gentleman with all those offices and titles was the chiefest of the ten citizens of the place. Think of hotelkeeper, postmaster, blacksmith, mayor, constable, city marshal and principal citizen all condensed into one person and crammed into one skin. [Fellow passenger] Bemis said he was 'a perfect Allen's revolver of dignities.' [The Allen was a small revolver notorious for sometimes firing all six chambers at once, according to Mark Twain.] And he said that if he were to die as postmaster, or as blacksmith, or as postmaster and blacksmith both, the people might stand it; but if he were to die all over, it would be a frightful loss to the community."

In 1866, gold was discovered in the vicinity, and a year later prospecting began on what would become the Carissa mine. Prospectors and adventurers quickly arrived and founded South Pass City. Within a year, the community's population had swelled to about 2,000. William H. Bright, a saloon owner who was elected to the Wyoming Territorial Legislature and served as President of the Territorial Council, introduced a women's suffrage bill, which passed. When the Women's Suffrage Act was signed into law by Territorial Governor John A. Campbell on December 10, 1869, Wyoming became the first jurisdiction in the United States to grant women the right to vote, a right which was not granted women nationally until 1920.

Esther Hobart Morris became the first female justice of the peace in the United States in 1870. She began her tenure as justice in South Pass City on February 14, 1870, serving a term of nearly 9 months. The Sweetwater County Board of County Commissioners appointed Morris as justice of the peace after the previous justice, R.S. Barr, resigned in protest of Wyoming Territory's passage of the women's suffrage amendment in December 1869.

Within a decade, the city's population shrank dramatically, as the large gold deposits that had been hoped for failed to materialize. By the mid-1870s South Pass City's population was reduced to about 100 people but apparently grew to 180 by 1901. Over the next century the population of South Pass City declined even further. Many of the city's homes, mercantile stores, hotels and saloons fell into disrepair.  A few businesses continued to operate in South Pass City, with the last of the pioneer families finally moving out in 1949.

South Pass City State Historic Site
By the end of the 20th century, steps were being taken to renew the community, and to develop it as an historic site for destination tourism. The community in the early 21st century consists of two areas: South Pass City, in which a handful of residents live, and South Pass City State Historic Site, which preserves more than 30 historic structures dating from the city's heyday in the 1860s and 1870s. In 1970, the community was added to the National Register of Historic Places.

The town has been extensively documented by the Historic American Buildings Survey (HABS) in drawings and in photographs, by HABS photographer Jack Boucher.

Highways

Popular culture
In The Outlaw Trail: A Journey Through Time, Robert Redford devoted a chapter to South Pass City.

Gallery

References

External links
 
South Pass City Historic Site Friends of South Pass
South Pass City State Historic Site Wyoming State Parks, Historic Sites & Trails
South Pass City Wyoming State Historic Preservation Office
City of Gold: The Story of South Pass City Documentary produced by Wyoming PBS
South Pass City Prints & Photographs Online Catalog of the Library of Congress
 

1867 establishments in Dakota Territory
Ghost towns in Wyoming
Historic American Buildings Survey in Wyoming
Historic districts on the National Register of Historic Places in Wyoming
Mining communities in Wyoming
Mining museums in the United States
Museums in Fremont County, Wyoming
Open-air museums in Wyoming
Populated places established in 1867
Unincorporated communities in Fremont County, Wyoming
Unincorporated communities in Wyoming
Wyoming state historic sites
National Register of Historic Places in Fremont County, Wyoming
Populated places on the National Register of Historic Places in Wyoming
IUCN Category III